Medusanthera is a genus of flowering plants belonging to the family Stemonuraceae.

Its native range is Thailand to Western Pacific.

Species:

Medusanthera gracilis 
Medusanthera howardii 
Medusanthera inaequalis 
Medusanthera laxiflora 
Medusanthera malayana 
Medusanthera megistocarpa 
Medusanthera samoensis 
Medusanthera vitiensis

References

Stemonuraceae
Asterid genera